Turtle Islands can refer to:

Turtle Islands National Park, Malaysia
Turtle Islands Wildlife Sanctuary, the Philippines
Turtle Islands, Caroline Islands, an atoll in the Caroline Islands
Turtle Islands, Sierra Leone
Turtle Islands, Tawi-Tawi, a municipality in the Philippines

See also
Turtle Island (disambiguation)
Turtle Group, four small islands in Great Barrier Reef Marine Park, Queensland, Australia
Guishan Island, Taiwan, also known as Turtle Island